The Munhwa Ryu clan or Munhwa Yu clan of Korea (Korean: 문화 류씨 or 문화 유씨, Hanja: 文化 柳氏) is one of the great aristocratic houses of Goryeo and Joseon dynasty. Munhwa is the name of the clan seat, a township in modern-day Sinchon County, Hwanghae province, North Korea. The surname "Ryu" comes from the character meaning willow tree. Hence, the lineage is also called "willow Ryu" (버들 류씨).

In the early tenth century AD the clan's progenitor Ryu Cha-dal (류차달, 柳車達) was instrumental in defeating subversive forces and reuniting the kingdom under a new regime, the Goryeo dynasty (고려왕조; 918–1392). For his loyalty and service King Taejo rewarded Ryu with estates and the title "helper in great victory" (대승공, 大丞公).

Until recently, it was thought that the Cha clan (차, 車) shared the same lineage as the Munhwa Ryu clan. However, historians have proven that this was in fact an error.

There are around 300,000 individuals in the clan. The clan is further divided into many smaller branches that were founded by people of Korean historical significance.

Connected members 
 Princess Munseong 
 Grand Princess Consort Munhwa

See also 
 Yoo (Korean name)

External links 
  
 (in English) 

 
Yu clans